Social Investment Business (SIB) is a UK registered charity and trading company that offers loans, grants and other financial products to charities and social enterprises.

SIB manages one of the largest social investment portfolios in the UK. Its foundation pioneered community investment in the UK and, to date, has leveraged over £30 million from corporate and public sector organisations.

In 2016, Hazel Blears was appointed as the new Chair of SIB, replacing Sir Stephen Bubb.

Activities

SIB has over 13 years of experience in social investment and has played an important role in helping develop the social investment market in the UK.  Since 2002, SIB has supported over 1,200 social sector organisations across England, and has disbursed over £390 million in grants and loans.

SIB is a market leader in developing and implementing investment readiness programmes, having first designed and delivered the 14 million ‘Investment and Contract Readiness Fund’ (ICRF) for the UK Cabinet Office from 2012-15. To date, the fund helped raise over £230 million in deals (investment and contracts).

More recently, SIB has managed and delivered Big Potential, Big Lottery Fund’s £20m fund aimed at improving the sustainability, capacity and scale of voluntary, community and social enterprise (VCSE) organisations and the £1.9 million ‘Impact Readiness Fund’.

SIB has also shared data on the performance of its investees, producing its own analysis and thought leadership reports as well as conducting external evaluations. SIB integrates data collection and analysis into all of its funds, as evidenced by the evaluations and data packs made publicly available on the performance of the Investment and Contract Readiness Fund, Futurebuilders England Fund  and their participation in the EngagedX analysis ‘Social Investment through a data lens’

History

SIB was originally formed from the Adventure Capital Fund (ACF), a demonstration project with £3.3m Home Office investment to support community enterprises with loans, grants and support. After obtaining charitable status and taking on the management of several high profile funds the Social Investment Business Group was formed in 2009.

2002 The Adventure Capital Fund (ACF) is launched.
2003 The first investment from the ACF is made – in Action for Business Bradford (£300,000).
2006 ACF becomes a registered charity in its own right – the Adventure Capital Fund.
2007 Moss Side and Hulme Community Development Trust are the first organisation to repay an ACF loan in full.
2008 ACF starts managing the Futurebuilders Fund. Futurebuilders had originally been set up in 2004 by the Cabinet Office as a £125m investment fund to help third sector organisations in England bid for, win and deliver public service contracts.
2009 The £100m Social Enterprise Investment Fund is launched. It is managed on behalf of the UK Department of Health to enhance the role of social enterprise in the provision of health and social care.
2009 The £70m Communitybuilders Fund is launched. ACF led a consortium to manage the fund on behalf of the Department for Communities and Local Government. The fund supported neighbourhood-based, community-led organisations to become more sustainable through a mixture of loans, grants and business support.
2009 The Social Investment Business Group is created. The group consisted of parent charity, the ACF, and fund manager social enterprise, the Social Investment Business.
2011 The Communitybuilders Fund is transferred to the group as a permanent endowment that could continue to support local community projects.
2012 Social Investment Business Group celebrates its tenth year of social investing.
2012 The three year Investment and Contract Readiness Fund is launched. Funded by the Cabinet Office, SIB manage this programme to help charities and social enterprises raise investment or win contracts. 
2013 Launch of partnership with Social and Sustainable Capital, an FCA regulated Fund Manager.
2014 ACF is renamed the Social Investment Business Foundation.
2014 The Big Potential fund is launched. SIB manage this Big Lottery funded investment readiness programme that aims to improve the sustainability, capacity and scale of charities and social enterprises so they can deliver greater social impact
2014 SIB wins a Charity Times award in the 'Social Investment Initiative' category.
2016 Hazel Blears appointed the new chair of the group.

Funds Managed

	Investment and Contract Readiness Fund (ICRF) 
	Impact Readiness Fund
	Big Potential
	Liverpool City Region Impact Fund
	Futurebuilders England 
	Social Enterprise Investment Fund
	Communitybuilders
	Adventure Capital Fund
	Childcare Investment Readiness Fund

Structure
Social Investment Business is the trading name for the Social Investment Business Foundation, Social Investment Business Limited and Futurebuilders-England Limited. Together these organisations represent the SIB Group.

Examples of Funded Projects

 Lichfield Canal Aqueduct

See also

Social Investment
Big Society Capital

References

Charities based in the United Kingdom